Paragorgia is a genus of soft coral in the family Paragorgiidae.

Species 
The following species are recognized:

 Paragorgia alisonae Sánchez, 2005
 Paragorgia aotearoa Sánchez, 2005
 Paragorgia arborea (Linnaeus, 1758)
 Paragorgia coralloides Bayer, 1993
 Paragorgia johnsoni Gray, 1862
 Paragorgia kaupeka Sánchez, 2005
 Paragorgia maunga Sánchez, 2005
 Paragorgia regalis Nutting, 1912
 Paragorgia sibogae Bayer, 1993
 Paragorgia splendens Thomson & Henderson, 1906
 Paragorgia stephencairnsi Sánchez, 2005
 Paragorgia tapachtli Sánchez, 2005
 Paragorgia wahine Sánchez, 2005
 Paragorgia whero Sánchez, 2005
 Paragorgia yutlinux Sánchez, 2005

References 

Paragorgiidae
Octocorallia genera
Taxa named by Henri Milne-Edwards